The 2012–13 Texas–Arlington Mavericks men's basketball team represented the University of Texas at Arlington during the 2012–13 NCAA Division I men's basketball season. The Mavericks, led by seventh year head coach Scott Cross, played their home games at the College Park Center and were first year members of the Western Athletic Conference. This was their only season as a member of the WAC as they joined the Sun Belt Conference in July 2013. They finished the season 19–14, 11–7 in WAC play to finish in a tie for fourth place. They advanced to the championship game of the WAC tournament where they lost to New Mexico State. They were invited to the 2013 CIT where they lost in the first round to Oral Roberts.

Roster

Schedule

|-
!colspan=9| Regular season

|-
!colspan=9| WAC tournament

|-
!colspan=9| 2013 CIT

References

UT Arlington Mavericks men's basketball seasons
Texas-Arlington
Texas-Arlington
2012 in sports in Texas